Jean Fournier may refer to:
 Jean Fournier (sport shooter), French sport shooter
 Jean Alfred Fournier, French dermatologist